The 1982 Transamerica Open, also known as the Pacific Coast Championships, was a men's tennis tournament played on indoor carpet courts at the Cow Palace in San Francisco, California in the United States. The event was part of the Super Series of the 1982 Volvo Grand Prix circuit. It was the 94th edition of the tournament and was held from September 20 through September 26, 1982. Second-seeded John McEnroe won the singles title, his third at the event after 1978 and 1979 and earned $40,000 first-prize money.

Finals

Singles
 John McEnroe defeated  Jimmy Connors 6–1, 6–3
 It was McEnroe's 2nd singles title of the year and the 36th of his career.

Doubles
 Brian Teacher /  Fritz Buehning defeated  Marty Davis /  Chris Dunk 6–7(5–7), 6–2, 7–5

See also
 Connors–McEnroe rivalry

References

External links
 ITF tournament edition details

Transamerica Open
Pacific Coast International Open
Transamerica Open
Transamerica Open
Transamerica Open